Jeremiah Daniel Delaney (February 22, 1873 – after 1940) was an American football and track and field coach.

Early life and playing career
A native of Worcester, Massachusetts, Delaney attended Georgetown University, where he ran track, played as an end on the Georgetown Hoyas football team, and played as an outfielder on the Hoyas baseball team.

Coaching career

St. Bonaventure
Delaney served as the head football coach at St. Bonaventure University in Allegany, New York for two seasons, from 1903 and 1904, compiling a record of 7–4.

References

1873 births
Year of death missing
American football ends
Baseball outfielders
Georgetown Hoyas baseball players
Georgetown Hoyas football players
Georgetown Hoyas men's track and field athletes
Iowa Hawkeyes track and field coaches
St. Bonaventure Brown Indians football coaches
Players of American football from Worcester, Massachusetts
Baseball players from Worcester, Massachusetts